Natasha Kaiser-Brown (born May 14, 1967) is an American sprinter who specialized in the 400 meter run. As of 2022, she is the head coach of track and field at the University of Missouri in Columbia, Missouri.

Kaiser-Brown was born in Des Moines, Iowa. In high school, she was a nine-time state champion for Des Moines Roosevelt and is the previous record-holder for the 100 meter and sprint medley relay events (both broken in the 2018 track season).

As a member of the Missouri Tigers track and field team from 1985–89, she won five individual conference titles, earned NCAA All-American honors in the 400m dash six times, and named Big 8 Female Athlete of the Year in 1989. In 1989, she also was the 400m dash Indoor National Champion with a collegiate record time of 51.92 seconds, which still stands as the school record.

At the 1991 Pan American Games she finished fourth in the 400 meter run and won a gold medal in 4 x 400 meter relay. She won a silver medal in the relay at the 1992 Summer Olympics with her teammates Gwen Torrence, Jearl Miles and Rochelle Stevens. In 1993 she won a relay silver medal at the 1993 World Indoor Championships as well as two medals at the 1993 World Championships.  She won the 400 meter event at the 1994 Nationals and was a member of the 1996 USA Olympic team in Atlanta.

Her personal best time is 50.17 seconds, achieved in 1993.

She is married to Brian Brown and coached alongside him at Drake University. The pair have a daughter, Elle Brown, who is a basketball player at the University of Missouri.

References

 USATF bio

External links
 

1967 births
Living people
Sportspeople from Des Moines, Iowa
Track and field athletes from Iowa
American female sprinters
African-American female track and field athletes
Missouri Tigers women's track and field athletes
Missouri Tigers track and field coaches
Olympic silver medalists for the United States in track and field
Athletes (track and field) at the 1992 Summer Olympics
Medalists at the 1992 Summer Olympics
Pan American Games gold medalists for the United States
Pan American Games medalists in athletics (track and field)
Athletes (track and field) at the 1991 Pan American Games
World Athletics Championships athletes for the United States
World Athletics Championships medalists
Universiade medalists in athletics (track and field)
Goodwill Games medalists in athletics
Drake Bulldogs track and field coaches
Universiade gold medalists for the United States
World Athletics Indoor Championships medalists
World Athletics Championships winners
Medalists at the 1989 Summer Universiade
Competitors at the 1994 Goodwill Games
Medalists at the 1991 Pan American Games
Theodore Roosevelt High School (Iowa) alumni
21st-century African-American people
21st-century African-American women
20th-century African-American sportspeople
20th-century African-American women
20th-century African-American people